...If I Die, I Die is the debut studio album by Irish rock band Virgin Prunes. It was released on 4 November 1982 by record label Rough Trade. It was produced by Colin Newman of Wire.

Track listing

Critical reception 

...If I Die, I Die has been well received by critics. AllMusic, in their retrospective review of the album, called it "a wonderfully confounding and sometimes campy and often disturbing exercise in unfettered creativity". Chuck Eddy of Spin included it in his list of essential gothic rock albums, remarking that it "demonstrates that sometimes 'ritualistic' equals 'catchy'."

Personnel 

Virgin Prunes
 Dave-iD Busaras – vocals
 Mary D'Nellon – drums
 Dik Evans – guitar
 Gavin Friday – vocals
 Guggi (Derek Rowen) – vocals
 Trevor "Strongman" Rowen   – bass guitar

 Technical
 Colin Newman – production
 Kevin Moloney – engineering
 Steve Parker – engineering
 Denis Blackham – engineering
 BilBo – mastering
 RX – sleeve design
 Ursula Steiger – sleeve design

Charts

Release history

References

External links 
 

1982 debut albums
Rough Trade Records albums
Virgin Prunes albums